

Richard John Chaves is an American character actor.

Biography

Career
Chaves helped write the critically acclaimed stage drama Tracers. In the early 1980s, he began work as an actor taking on various soap opera roles until he gained a  role in 1987 as Poncho in the science fiction film Predator. Soon afterward, his career received another boost with the role of Lt. Colonel Ironhorse in the television series War of the Worlds. Chaves once calculated that the volume of fan mail he received outnumbered the rest of the cast members by a four or five to one ratio.

However, his career hit a bump when War of the Worlds was given new creative management for its second season. The new executives did not think that the Ironhorse character worked with the format they wanted for the show, so his character and that of Norton Drake were killed off.

His most recent acting appearances were in the films Lost Warrior: Left Behind,  Dark House and Beyond the Game.

Personal life

Chaves served in the Vietnam War with the US Army’s 196th Infantry Brigade.

In the late 1990s, Chaves became the target of a stalker. To protect himself, his family and friends, he followed the advice of police by refraining from attending conventions and closing his official website.

Chaves has made few public appearances over the years since being stalked. He appeared at the Las Vegas Comic-Con in October 2003; in late 2006 he was photographed with Frances Fisher at the premiere of Flags of our Fathers; he was a guest at the Chicagoland Entertainment Collectors Expo in October 2007; he appeared at the Gallifrey One convention in February 2007, and was scheduled to attend again in February 2008. In June 2009 he was present as a guest star at Collectormania, a film and comic convention which was hosted at the Stadium MK in Milton Keynes, UK.

Works

Stage
19??  Pendleton Blankst
19??  Vietnam Trilogy
19??  Labyrinth
19??  Macbeth
19??  Romeo & Juliet
1980/85  Tracers (co-author) ... Dinky Dau
1995  Santos & Santos ... Miguel Santos
1997  Police Officer's Wives (P.O.W.) ... Franko
2001  Pvt. Wars ... Silvio

Movies
1981  Fire on the Mountain ... Army lieutenant
1985  Witness ... Detective
1985   Cease Fire ... Badman
1986  Penalty Phase ... Nolan Esherman
1987  Kenny Rogers as The Gambler, Part III: The Legend Continues ... Irondog (Sioux Indian)
1987  Predator ... Jorge "Poncho" Ramirez
1988  Onassis: The Richest Man in the World ... Turkish Officer
1988  To Heal a Nation ... Veteran
1989  L.A. Takedown (aka Crimewave) ... Lou Casals
1992  Night Eyes 2 ... Hector Mejenes
1994  Night Realm ... Ursis
1996  Baja Run ... Domingo
1997  Weapons of Mass Distraction ... Senator Ramirez
1998  Lone Greasers (30 min. short film) ... Las Vegas police officer
2007  Blizhniy Boy: The Ultimate Fighter ... ??
2008  Lost Warrior: Left Behind ... Captain Johansson
2009  Dark House ... Officer Jones
2016  Beyond the Game ... Captain Johansson

Television
1981  Eight Is Enough "Father Knows Best?" ... U.S. Marine Captain "Bobo"
1982  Dallas "The Search" ... Bernie
1983  St. Elsewhere "Brothers" ... Tim Potts
1983  Hill Street Blues "The Russians Are Coming" ... doctor
1987  Miami Vice "Theresa" ... District Attorney Martinez
1988  Ohara "They Shoot Witnesses Don't They?" ... Earl Baker
1988  War of the Worlds (season 1: all 23 episodes; season 2: "The Second Wave") ... Lt. Col. Paul Ironhorse
1990  L.A. Law "Bang... Zoom... Zap" ... Carlos Mendez
1990  MacGyver "Tough Boys" ... Det. Anthony "Manny" Lopez
1990  MacGyver "The Treasure of Manco" ... Enrique Vasquez
1990  Trials of Rosie O'Neill "Mr. Right" ... Det. John Santos
1991  Sons and Daughters "Throw Momma From the Terrain" ... Michael Valdez
1992  FBI: The Untold Stories "The Blue Fiber" ... Det. Joe Swiski
1994  Babylon 5 "The War Prayer" ... Alvares
1995  Star Trek: Voyager "Tattoo" ... tribal chief
1996  Walker, Texas Ranger "Deadline" ... Special Agent Samuel Mills
2001  Days of Our Lives "Episode #1.9109" ... Capt. Eduardo

Voice
1987  Dear America: Letters Home from Vietnam ... himself/additional dialogue
2010  Elf Sparkle and the Special Red Dress ... Buzzoose
2009  Elf Sparkle Meets Christmas the Horse ... Buzzoose

References

External links

 
 Richard Chaves fansite - screenshots, interviews, forum

Living people
American male film actors
American male soap opera actors
American male television actors
Place of birth missing (living people)
1951 births